The Men's 100 metre breaststroke event at the 2013 Southeast Asian Games took place on 13 December 2013 at Wunna Theikdi Aquatics Centre.

There were 14 competitors from 8 countries who took part in this event. Two heats were held. The heat in which a swimmer competed did not formally matter for advancement, as the swimmers with the top eight times from both field qualified for the finals.

Schedule
All times are Myanmar Standard Time (UTC+06:30)

Records

Results

Heats

Final

Controversy 
The bronze medallist, Joshua Hall from the Philippines, is expected to have his bronze medal upgraded to a silver medal, after the International Swimming Federation (FINA) slapped a two-year ban on Indonesian swimmer Indra Gunawan, who won the silver medal in the event. Gunawan’s urine sample tested positive for Methylhexaneamine, a performance-enhancing substance, during random testing at the 4th Asian Indoor and Martial Arts Games held in July 2013.

References

External links

Swimming at the 2013 Southeast Asian Games